The 2007 NCAA Division I Men's Basketball Championship Game was the finals of the 2007 NCAA Division I men's basketball tournament and determined the national champion for the 2006–07 NCAA Division I men's basketball season. The 2007 National Title game was played at the Georgia Dome in Atlanta, Georgia between the 2007 South Regional Champions, No. 1-seeded Ohio State and the 2007 Midwest Regional Champions, No. 1-seeded Florida. Florida won 84-75, to successfully defend their national championship, and as of 2023, are the last team to win back-to-back championships.

For the second time in three years, the National Title Game was played between two No. 1 seeds. This game was a rematch of the game at O'Connell Center on December 23, 2006, which was won by Florida who defeated Ohio State in an 86–60 victory. This game featured the same two teams that participated in the 2007 BCS National Championship Game marking the first time (and only current in Tournament history) that the same two schools were competing for the football and basketball national championships which saw Florida beat Ohio State 41–14 to be the national champions of college football.

Participants

Ohio State

Ohio State entered the 2007 NCAA tournament as the No. 1 seed in the South Region. In the first round, Greg Oden had a double-double to beat Central Connecticut State 78–57. In the second round, Ohio State overcame a late deficit for a 78–71 overtime win over Xavier. In the Sweet 16, Oden blocked a last second shot by Ramar Smith to beat Tennessee 85–84. In the Elite Eight of the 2007 NCAA Tournament, Ohio State used Oden's 17 points to beat Memphis 92–76 for a trip to the 2007 Final Four. In the Final Four, Oden's 13 points were six points short of Roy Hibbert's 19 points but it was Ohio State who got the victory beating Georgetown 67–60 for a trip to the 2007 National Championship Game.

Florida

Florida entered the 2007 NCAA tournament as the No. 1 seed in the Midwest Region. In the first round, Florida played a  dominant second half against Jackson State outscoring them 71–34 in the 2nd half to take a 112–69 win. In the second round, Florida beat Purdue 74–67 to stay alive in their quest for a 2nd straight national title. In the Sweet 16, Florida took another step closer to becoming the first team to win back-to-back championships since the 1991–92 Duke Blue Devils with a 65–57 win over Butler. In the Elite Eight, Florida beat Oregon 85–77 to advance to the 2007 Final Four. In the 2007 Final Four, Florida beat UCLA 76–66 to advance to the 2007 National Title Game.

Starting lineups

Game summary

In a rematch of a regular season meeting which had been won 86–60 by Florida in Gainesville, the Gators survived 25 points and 12 rebounds from Buckeyes center Greg Oden with stellar play from guards Lee Humphrey and Taurean Green with inside contributions coming from Al Horford (18 points) and tourney Most Outstanding Player Corey Brewer. Billy Donovan became the third-youngest coach (at age 41) to win two titles. Only Bob Knight (at Indiana) and San Francisco's Phil Woolpert both won two titles at the age of 40.

The Gators are the first team ever to hold the NCAA Division I college football and basketball titles in the same academic year (2006–07) and calendar year (2006 and 2007). Coincidentally, Florida also beat Ohio State (by a score of 41–14) in the College Football Championship, the first time in college sports history that identical match-ups and results have occurred in both football and basketball championships. This was also the first time in NCAA D-I men's basketball history that exactly the same starting five were able to win back-to-back titles (Joakim Noah, Corey Brewer, Lee Humphrey, Al Horford, Taurean Green). Florida's Lee Humphrey also set the all-time NCAA Tournament record for three-point field goals made with 47. Humphrey surpassed Bobby Hurley's record of 42.

References

NCAA Division I Men's Basketball Championship Game
NCAA Division I Men's Basketball Championship Games
Florida Gators men's basketball
Ohio State Buckeyes men's basketball
College basketball tournaments in Georgia (U.S. state)
Basketball competitions in Atlanta
April 2007 sports events in the United States
NCAA Division I Men's Basketball Championship Game
2007 in Atlanta